The North Mainland of the Shetland Islands, Scotland is the part of the Mainland lying north of Voe (60° 21′N).

Geography
Notable places in North Mainland include:

Sullom Voe, its oil terminal being an important source of employment for the islanders.
Brae
Muckle Roe
Esha Ness Lighthouse
Cunnigill Hill, 176 ft
Toft ferry terminal, connecting the A968 to Yell
Lunna Ness, with Lunna
Lunnasting peninsula , with Lunning and Vidlin, with a ferry connecting to Whalsay
the large Northmavine peninsula, connected to Mainland by a narrow isthmus at Mavis Grind
North Roe
Ronas Hill, 1475 ft/450 metres 
Ollaberry
Hillswick
Uyea island

To the north east, are the North Isles, and Yell Sound

Geography of Shetland
Mainland, Shetland